Official Officers is a 1925 American short silent comedy film directed by Robert F. McGowan. It was the 40th Our Gang short subject released.

Cast

The Gang
 Joe Cobb as Joe
 Jackie Condon as Jackie
 Mickey Daniels as Mickey
 Johnny Downs as Johnny
 Allen Hoskins as Farina
 Mary Kornman as Mary
 Pal the Dog as himself

Additional cast
 Elmo Billings as Rival gang member
 Jackie Hanes as Crying toddler
 Jannie Hoskins as Kid arrested by Farina
 Peggy Ahern as Girl arrested by Mary
 Gabe Saienz as Rival gang member
 James Finlayson as Angry motorist
 Jack Gavin as 'Hard-Boiled' McManus
 Dick Gilbert as Officer
 Chet Brandenburg as Construction worker
 George Rowe as Cross-eyed motorist
 Charley Young as Tony, the fruit vendor

References

External links

1925 films
1925 short films
1925 comedy films
American silent short films
American black-and-white films
Films directed by Robert F. McGowan
Hal Roach Studios short films
Our Gang films
1920s American films
Silent American comedy films
1920s English-language films